Masimba Hwati  is an interdisciplinary artist from Zimbabwe, working internationally at the intersections of sculpture, performance, and sound, known for his unconventional three-dimensional mixed media sculptures. Hwati graduated from Harare Polytechnic School of Art and Design in 2003 where he majored in Ceramics and Painting. Hwati taught Visual Arts and 3D Art at Harare Polytechnic School of Art and Design. He is a PhD Candidate at Akademie Der Bildenden Künste Wien ,Österreich,an MFA from Penny W. Stamps School of Art and Design University of Michigan, Ann Arbor He was most recently, included in the Montreal Museum of Fine Art's (MMFA) exhibition, Face To Face: From Yesterday to Today, Non-Western Art and Picasso. In 2015, he was also one of three artists , along with Chikonzero Chazunguza and Gareth Nyandoro, selected for Pixels Of Ubuntu/Unhu for the Zimbabwean Pavilion at the 56th Venice Biennale. He is an honorary research fellow at Rhodes University Fine Arts Department in Grahamstown, South Africa.

Techniques and aims
Hwati explores the transformation and evolution of knowledge systems that are indigenous to his own background whilst experimenting with the symbolism and perceptions attached to cultural objects, expressed as an art movement known as "The Energy of Objects".

Hwati attempts to work from basics, creating his own pigments, and creating objects from basic materials. His works use contemporary and historical themes. He also works extensively with found objects, transfoming existing artifacts into elements of works of art.

Hwati says that he should be able to find at least 35 variations in any given object, but says that often he cannot realize more than ten.

Critical reception
The University of Michigan School of Art  wrote about Hwati's 2015 exhibition there: 
Zimbabwean multi-disciplinary artist Masimba Hwati examines postcolonial themes by re-appropriating archives and objects and presenting them in new contexts. With an emphasis on sculptural work, Hwati collects historical, culturally imbued items ranging from cars and shoes, to scrap metal and found objects, altering and repositioning them in a contemporary urban setting. Hwati was named amongst 12 "The Ones to Watch" by New African Magazine ahead of the 1-54 Contemporary Art Fair in London at Somerset House.

Awards and honors

In 2006 Hwati won the National Art Merit Award, the highest individual art honour in Zimbabwe.  He was one of three national representatives who had a showing at the Zimbabwean Pavilion exhibition, Pixels Of Ubuntu/Unhu, at the 56th Venice Biennale.

Exhibitions

Solo exhibitions

2017  Art Brussels - Belgium  (Solo booth Smac Gallery) 
2017   Instruments of Memory Stellenbosch Cape Town  
2016   Instruments of Memory / Simbi dzeNdangariro Smac Gallery Stellenbosch, Cape Town, South Africa
2016   Joburg Art fair Trek: Following Journeys 16.05.15 – 27.06.15
2014   Quantumlogik, Solo Exhibition, Gallery Delta Harare Zimbabwe  
2010   Facsimiles of Energy, Solo Exhibition, Gallery Delta Harare Zimbabwe

Group exhibitions

2015 Venice Biennale All the Worlds’ futures Curated by Okwui Enwezor, Pixels of Ubuntu Zimbabwe pavilion, curated by Raphael Chikukwa
2015 London I:54 Art Fair, London, UK

References

Living people
1982 births
Artists from Harare
Harare Polytechnic alumni
Academic staff of Harare Polytechnic
Penny W. Stamps School of Art & Design alumni
21st-century sculptors
Zimbabwean sculptors
Interdisciplinary artists
Contemporary artists